Patriot Brains is a New Zealand comedy panel game show, airing on TVNZ 2 in New Zealand and SBS Viceland in Australia since April 2021. The show, hosted by English comedian Bill Bailey in series 1 and Sue Perkins in series 2, focuses on the trans-Tasman rivalry by pitting two teams of three comics from Australia and New Zealand against each other. The host asks the teams a series of general knowledge questions about their respective countries from a revolving pool of categories. New Zealand production company thedownlowconcept produces the series, which receives funding from NZ On Air.

Episodes
Note: Winners are listed in bold

References

External links
 TVNZ webpage
 SBS webpage

Australia–New Zealand relations
English-language television shows
New Zealand game shows
Panel games
TVNZ 2 original programming